Sonic Disruptors was a comic book limited series written by Mike Baron with art by Barry Crain, and published by DC Comics between 1987 and 1988. Although it was advertised as being a twelve-issue story, sales were poor, and the last issue published was #7.

To date, the series remains incomplete; Baron has stated that he had not written a script for issue 8.

Baron has publicly described the series as a "dud", saying that he "didn't know what (he) was doing (when writing the series)", that he "had no end to the series in mind", and that he "didn't construct the characters properly".

Plot
Sonic Disruptors depicted a futuristic America ruled by a theocratic military dictatorship, where the only source of resistance is a pirate radio station broadcasting from orbit.

References

External links
Sonic Disruptors at Armagideon Time

DC Comics titles
1987 comics debuts
1988 comics endings
Unpublished comics